Sibynophis bistrigatus, commonly known as Günther's many-toothed snake, is a species of nonvenomous colubrid snake found in Myanmar (formerly called Burma) and India (Nicobar Islands), but snakes collected in Myanmar and the Nicobar Islands might actually not refer to the same species. This rare snake is known from tropical dry forests.

References

Sibynophis
Reptiles of Myanmar
Reptiles of India
Fauna of the Andaman and Nicobar Islands
Reptiles described in 1868
Taxa named by Albert Günther